Mite Mae Chit is a 2020 Burmese drama film, directed by Zaw Myo starring Myint Myat, Shwe Hmone Yati and Khin Wint Wah. The film, produced by Lucky Seven Film Production premiered Myanmar on January 9, 2020.

Cast
Myint Myat as Htit Chone Moe
Shwe Hmone Yati as Mal Yun Bone
Khin Wint Wah as Ka Thit Ni

References

2020 films
2020s Burmese-language films
Burmese drama films
Films shot in Myanmar
2020 drama films